Bembidion ephippium is a small, fast-moving water beetle in the Trechinae subfamily that can be found in such Belgian cities as Nieuwpoort and Ostend. It can also be found in Wimereux, France.

Threat status
The species is considered to be Critically Endangered in Belgium. It is under protection since September 22, 1980.

References

Beetles described in 1802
Beetles of Europe